Sounds from Nowheresville is the second studio album by English indie pop duo The Ting Tings, released on 24 February 2012 by Columbia Records. It was by preceded the lead single "Hang It Up", which was released on 27 December 2011. Although their 2010 single "Hands" was originally reported not to appear on the album, the duo confirmed on Twitter that it would appear on the deluxe edition of the album. The band revealed that they scrapped an entire album after "stumbl[ing] on this new sound" during a visit to Spain.

The band launched a contest called Show Us Yours, which gave artists and graphic designers the chance to create art and videos to show the band. One piece of art by artist Milan Abad showed both Katie White and Jules De Martino as skeletons, which caught the band's attention and ultimately became the album's artwork. White stated that other entries would be placed in the album insert.

Sounds from Nowheresville debuted at number twenty-three on the UK Albums Chart with first-week sales of 6,246 copies.

Background and recording
The duo began writing their second album in Paris, France. The album was recorded over a period of eight months in the basement of a former jazz club in the Friedrichshain area of Berlin, Germany. Jules De Martino stated that they chose Berlin "to have complete, crazy freedom", while Katie White also said that they wanted to "isolate themselves". According to De Martino: "We had to find a new challenge and going to hide away in Berlin was the perfect place because our friends aren't there, our families aren't there and our record company isn't there, so no one really bothered us. I think that if we'd have gone back to Manchester we'd have been a mess." It was reported that the band would collaborate with rapper Jay-Z on the new album. The duo were reportedly assisted by labelmate and Barbadian-R&B star Rihanna, who contributed vocals to a track.

The album featured a mix of styles, with the band aiming for a 'playlist' feel. De Martino explained: "We wanted to make a record that had that much variety that if you played it you could almost shut your eyes and think: 'Is this the same band on each song?' We just had no fear and wanted to make a record that was like an MP3 compilation." De Martino stated that influences on the album included Fleetwood Mac, the Pet Shop Boys, and TLC. It was described by Clash writer April Welsh as "an album glistening with polished pop perfection. Ranging from acoustic folk to bangin’ electro, R‘n’B and, of course, rock and roll." The album was self-produced, with White explaining "We're complete control freaks – I don't think we could work with anyone else. We'd have a heart attack if they changed one little beat."

Early in 2010, it was reported that the album would be called Kunst. De Martino explained that the name was taken from a massage parlour near their studio called Massage Kunst: "We took a picture of us standing outside it with Katie's arm up over the S and sent it to the label saying: 'Here's the front sleeve.' It didn't go down too well." The band later announced that Kunst had just been a working title and that the final name was yet to be decided. They later joked that instead it would be called Cocks.

The duo ultimately cancelled the release of their second album in 2010 because they felt it sounded too similar to everything else on the radio. In an interview with Digital Spy, White said, "We were in Berlin where there is a great electro scene, and so we made songs like that, but quickly realised that everything on the radio was Euro-pop shite. We didn't want our record to be tarnished with that brush." De Martino continued, "We scrapped six of the ten songs, which upset quite a few people. We put out 'Hands', which was meant to be an underground, white label-only release and it ended up being playlisted on Radio 1—we were quite angry so erased over half the album." They also insisted that they "found [their] feet" with their new album, adding, "No-one would give a shit if we'd made a shit Euro-pop song, even if it went top ten." The album was recorded in Berlin, London, Murcia and Ibiza.

Singles and promotion
The music video for the album's lead single, "Hang It Up" was uploaded to the duo's YouTube channel on 18 October 2011. "Hang It Up" was released digitally on 27 December 2011, the first song they had released since "Hands" in October 2010. Hang it Up experience the most commercial success in Japan peaking at number eight failing to chart in other countries, ending as a commercial failure.

A music video for the Bag Raiders remix of "Silence" was directed by Dan Gable and filmed at Salford Lads Club in Manchester in July 2011. The video premiered on 21 November 2011.

The album's second official single, "Hit Me Down Sonny", was added to the BBC Radio 1 C List on 2 May 2012. A four-track EP for the single was released digitally on 25 May 2012. An accompanying video, consisting of live footage from a show in Paris, debuted on 3 August 2012.

A video for "Soul Killing" was filmed on 29 June 2012. The duo stated on Twitter on 13 July 2012 that the video would be released soon, but this never materialised.

The Ting Tings also made videos for other songs from the album. A video for an acoustic rendition of "Day to Day" was uploaded to their YouTube channel on 14 March 2012. On 13 January 2012, the duo reported via Twitter that they were filming a video for "Help" in Manchester. However, the video was never released.

Critical reception

Sounds from Nowheresville received mixed reviews from music critics. At Metacritic, which assigns a normalised rating out of 100 to reviews from mainstream critics, the album received an average score of 52, based on 30 reviews, indicating "mixed or average reviews". Andy Gill of The Independent praised the album as "a masterclass in modern pop creation, pinballing from style to style without endangering their essential 'TingTingness'". The Daily Telegraphs Andrew Perry wrote that the album "sounds anything but laboured", concluding, "Whatever the style, White and de Martino [...] know how to knock a tune together and have delivered a pop party album thrillingly in tune with contemporary listening habits." Rolling Stones Jody Rosen opined that on Sounds from Nowheresville, "the band again is at its best when White is proclaiming [...] and dissing [...] in a voice pitched somewhere between cheerleader, rapper and Tourette's sufferer." Allmusic editor Heather Phares, however, felt that the "scrappy pop of their first album is largely [...] replaced by a glossy eclecticism that, for better or worse, feels labored over." Phares continued, "Sounds from Nowheresville shows that the Ting Tings have more range than their debut suggested, but while it's more ambitious and crafted, it's just not as coherent as We Started Nothing." The A.V. Clubs Dan Weiss commented the album is "a blast when it's on and imminently forgettable when it's not".

In a review for the NME, Fraser McAlpine dubbed it a "lukewarm hotchpotch of an album", adding that "[t]he unfortunate irony is that Sounds From Nowheresville doesn't sound much like a grand rejection of pop music at all. It just sounds a little bereft of ideas, and way too short." Stephen Foster of PopMatters characterised the album as "sluggish, self-conscious, and seemingly deliberately bad", while noting that "[t]he best Nowheresville has to offer is 'Hit Me Down Sonny', a band march of a song that offers up goofily incoherent lyrics but possess the energy and verve [...] of the best work from We Started Nothing." Simon Jay Catling of Drowned in Sound expressed that "despite the fact that the production glitters with the high attention-seeking compression of pop music, any explorations haven't gone as far as finding any memorable hooks—and the ones which do stick in the mind do more so for their sheer irritable inanity", citing tracks like "Silence", "One by One" and "In Your Life" as "decent moments". The Guardians Alexis Petridis stated that Sounds from Nowheresville "keeps doing the things bands do when they don't really know what to do: concentrating on riffs instead of melodies, production dynamics instead of songs. The result is an album that sounds simultaneously hefty and vaporous." Jonathan Keefe of Slant Magazine panned the album as "tuneless" and "inert", and found that its songs "aren't noteworthy in terms of content or construction, nor do they resolve into any kind of coherent aesthetic that would give context as to what it is the Ting Tings are really after." Pitchfork Media's Hari Ashurst critiqued that "[t]he restless genre-hopping vibe makes this feel less like an album and more like a series of tracks written to briefs [...] The only common thread is how uniformly bad everything is."

Track listing
All songs written by Katie White and Jules De Martino.

Personnel
Credits for the deluxe edition of Sounds from Nowheresville adapted from liner notes.

 Katie White – lead vocals, guitar
 Jules De Martino – drums, backing vocals, co-lead vocals (3, 4), guitar, producer (all tracks); engineer (2, 6, 8); mixing (4, 5)
 The Ting Tings – design
 James Abacus – remix (14)
 Bag Raiders – remix, additional production, keyboards (11)
 CKB – remix (19)
 Graeme Durham – mastering (1–11, 13, 15, 17, 18)
 David Eggar – cello (10)
 Calvin Harris – mixing (15)
 Andy Hayes – design

 Inertia – remix (12)
 Manny Marroquin – mixing (9, 13)
 Mike Marsh – mastering (1–11, 13, 15, 17, 18)
 Nilesh Patel – mastering (1–11, 13, 15, 17, 18)
 Shook – remix, additional production, keyboards (17)
 Chris Snow – engineer (3–5); mixing (3, 4, 10); extra guitar (3)
 Andy Taylor – remix, additional production (16)
 Marcos Tovar – engineer (1, 7, 9, 10, 15)
 Dave Turner – mastering (12, 14, 16, 19)
 Alex Vargas – remix (14)
 Jeremy Wheatley – mixing (1, 2, 6–8)

Charts

Release history

References

2012 albums
Columbia Records albums
The Ting Tings albums
Ska albums by English artists
Art pop albums